Filmworks II: Music for an Untitled Film by Walter Hill features the second release of scores for film by John Zorn. The album was originally released on the Japanese Toys Factory label in 1995 and subsequently re-released on Zorn's own label, Tzadik Records, in 1996.  It features the music that Zorn wrote and recorded for Trespass which director Walter Hill rejected in favour of a score by Ry Cooder.

Reception

The AllMusic review by Joslyn Layne notes that "Overall, it is very atmospheric, with sections of drawn-out tones that slowly build theater mists in the background of a deserted sense of waiting. Balancing stretches of this kind are sections of bent, mellow country... Lacking contrast, this one is definite background music, and although well done, it is also probably the least interesting of Zorn's film scores".

Track listing
 "Intro" - 3:07
 "I Stole From Jesus Christ" - 0:49
 "Gold" - 0:48
 "Main Title" - 1:55
 "The Building" - 0:56
 "Meatlocker" - 0:55
 "Pigeons" - 0:52
 "Scuffle" - 0:19
 "Exploring" - 0:58
 "Rattlesnakes (for Sergio Leone)" - 1:43
 "Two Interiors" - 0:38
 "Stealth" - 0:42
 "Action" - 0:48
 "Dumping The Body" - 0:34
 "The Trunk" - 0:06
 "Escape Attempt" - 1:39
 "Arrival" - 0:43
 "Prying At The Windows"	- 0:35
 "Arsenal" - 0:54
 "King James" - 1:04
 "Powerline" - 0:19
 "The Magic Of Gold" - 2:25
 "Chimney" - 0:23
 "Dilemma" - 1:12
 "Conspiracy" - 0:45
 "The Plot (part one)" - 1:32
 "The Plot (part two)" - 0:43
 "Heroin Fix" - 2:40
 "Lucky Run" - 0:58
 "Vengeance Is Mine" - 2:03
 "Escape" - 2:00
 "Kill Fever" - 1:15
 "Outside" - 0:21
 "Ending" - 0:50
 "Alternate Ending/End Title" - 2:32
 "Arsenal Dance Mix" - 3:57

All compositions by John Zorn

Recorded and mixed May/June 1992 at Shelley Palmer Studios, New York City

Personnel
 Cyro Baptista: Brazilian percussion
 Anthony Coleman: prepared piano, keyboards
 Carol Emanuel: jew's harp
 Andy Haas: didjeridu
 Jim Pugliese: percussion
 Marc Ribot: guitar, banjo
 David Shea: turntables, sampler

References

Tzadik Records soundtracks
Albums produced by John Zorn
John Zorn soundtracks
1995 soundtrack albums
Film scores